Hyaenodon ("hyena-tooth") is an extinct genus of carnivorous hyaenodont mammals from tribe Hyaenodontini, within subfamily Hyaenodontinae in family Hyaenodontidae, that lived in Eurasia and North America during the middle Eocene to early Miocene, existing for about 25.1 million years.

Description

Typical of early carnivorous mammals, individuals of Hyaenodon had a very massive skull, but only a small brain. The skull is long with a narrow snout - much larger in relation to the length of the skull than in canine carnivores, for instance. The neck was shorter than the skull, while the body was long and robust and terminated in a long tail. Compared to the generally larger (but not closely related) Hyainailouros, the dentition of Hyaenodon was geared more towards shearing meat and less towards bone crushing.

Some species of this genus were among the largest terrestrial carnivorous mammals of their time; others were only of the size of a marten. Remains of many species are known from North America, Europe, and Asia. H. crucians from the early Oligocene of North America is estimated to only .

Tooth eruption
Studies on juvenile Hyaenodon specimens show that the animal had a very unusual system of tooth replacement. Juveniles took about 3–4 years to complete the final stage of eruption, implying a long adolescent phase. In North American forms, the first upper premolar erupts before the first upper molar, while European forms show an earlier eruption of the first upper molar.

Paleoecology
The various species of Hyaenodon competed with each other and with other hyaenodont genera (including Sinopa, Dissopsalis, and Hyainailurus), and played important roles as predators in ecological communities as late as the Miocene in Asia and preyed on a variety of prey species such as primitive horses like Mesohippus, Brontotheres, early camels, oreodonts and even primitive rhinos. Species of Hyaenodon have been shown to have successfully preyed on other large carnivores of their time, including a nimravid ("false sabertooth cat"), according to analysis of tooth puncture marks on a fossil Dinictis skull found in North Dakota.

In North America the last Hyaenodon, in the form of H. brevirostrus, disappeared in the late Oligocene. In Europe, they had already vanished earlier in the Oligocene.

Classification and phylogeny

Taxonomy
 Tribe: †Hyaenodontini 
 Genus: †Hyaenodon 
 †Hyaenodon brachyrhynchus 
 †Hyaenodon chunkhtensis 
 †Hyaenodon dubius 
 †Hyaenodon eminus 
 †Hyaenodon exiguus 
 †Hyaenodon filholi 
 †Hyaenodon gervaisi 
 †Hyaenodon heberti (Europe, 41-33.9 mya) 
 †Hyaenodon leptorhynchus 
 †Hyaenodon minor 
 †Hyaenodon pervagus 
 †Hyaenodon pumilus 
 †Hyaenodon requieni 
 †Hyaenodon rossignoli 
 †Hyaenodon weilini (China, 23-16,9 mya) 
 †Hyaenodon yuanchuensis 
 Subgenus: †Neohyaenodon (paraphyletic subgenus) 
 †Hyaenodon gigas 
 †Hyaenodon horridus 
 †Hyaenodon incertus 
 †Hyaenodon macrocephalus 
 †Hyaenodon megaloides 
 †Hyaenodon milvinus 
 †Hyaenodon mongoliensis 
 †Hyaenodon montanus 
 †Hyaenodon vetus 
 Subgenus: †Protohyaenodon (paraphyletic subgenus) 
 †Hyaenodon brevirostrus 
 †Hyaenodon crucians 
 †Hyaenodon microdon 
 †Hyaenodon mustelinus (North America, 38-30 mya) 
 †Hyaenodon raineyi 
 †Hyaenodon venturae

Phylogeny
The phylogenetic relationships of genus Hyaenodon are shown in the following cladogram

See also
 Mammal classification
 Hyaenodontinae

References

Hyaenodonts
Eocene mammals
Oligocene mammals
Miocene mammals
Miocene genus extinctions
Cenozoic mammals of Asia
Cenozoic mammals of North America
Cenozoic mammals of Europe
White River Fauna
Eocene genus first appearances
Prehistoric placental genera
Fossil taxa described in 1838